The Louis Rehm Barn near Hebron, North Dakota, United States, was built in 1917.  It was built by Adam Rehm and, in 1994 was owned by Armin Rehm.  It is also known as the Armin Rehm Barn.  The barn was listed on the National Register of Historic Places in 1994. Other farm buildings were of lesser significance or integrity so were not nominated.

The barn is described in its NRHP nomination as an example of an "early application of the gothic arch roof in barn design" and having a "commanding profile". It is built with Douglas fir balloon framing and has fir drop siding.

The barn got electricity in 1918.

References

Barns on the National Register of Historic Places in North Dakota
Buildings and structures completed in 1917
National Register of Historic Places in Morton County, North Dakota
1917 establishments in North Dakota
Gothic-arch barns